Orange Julius is an American chain of fruit drink beverage stores. It has been in business since the late 1920s and is noted for a particular drink, also called an Orange Julius. The beverage is a mixture of  ice, orange juice, sweetener, milk, powdered egg whites and vanilla flavoring.

History 
The drink grew out of an orange juice stand opened in Los Angeles, California, in 1926 by Julius Freed. Sales were initially modest, about $20 a day (equivalent to approximately $ in  dollars). In 1929, Bill Hamlin, Freed's real estate broker, developed a mixture that made the acidic orange juice less bothersome to his stomach. Freed's stand began serving the drink, which had a frothier, creamier texture. The sales at the stand increased substantially after the introduction of the new drink, going up to $100 a day.

During the 1950s and 1960s, Orange Julius was sold at a variety of outlets, including state and county fairs and freestanding Orange Julius stands. The original stand also provided medicinal tonics and Bible tracts.

In 1967, Hamlin sold Orange Julius to Al Lapin Jr's International Industries corporation, who also owns International House of Pancakes; The Original House of Pies, and others; until IHOP sold it in the 1970s.

It now has hundreds of stores in malls across the United States (including Puerto Rico) and Canada, as well as in Singapore, South Korea, the Philippines and Japan.

In 1987, the Orange Julius chain was bought by International Dairy Queen. IDQ, a subsidiary of Berkshire Hathaway, owns the rights to all Orange Julius stores and has expanded the chain so its drinks are offered at many of its Dairy Queen stores, called Treat Centers.

Naming and mascot
The Orange Julius was named the official drink of the 1964 New York World's Fair.

In the 1970s and early 1980s, Orange Julius beverage stands used the image of a devil with a pitchfork around an orange, with the slogan, "A Devilish Good Drink". The devil image resembled Sparky, the mascot of Arizona State University, and the company later dropped the logo and slogan after threats of a lawsuit from the ASU alumni association.

For a short period in the early 1970s, Orange Julius expanded into the UK and Dutch markets, with a fairly large restaurant in Golders Green, selling Julius Burgers as well as the classic orange drink, and a small outlet in the city center of Amsterdam. There were plans to increase the number to 20-25 outlets in the Netherlands, and at least one was realized, in the city of Utrecht. The brand was introduced and largely financed in the Netherlands by Eurobee NV, a subsidiary of Koninklijke Bijenkorf Beheer (KBB), one of the major retailers in The Netherlands at that time. Orange Julius left the Dutch market by the mid-70s.

See also
 Gibeau Orange Julep
 Juice bar
 Morir soñando

Notes

Sources
 Mariani, John F. (1999). The Encyclopedia of American Food and Drink. New York: Lebhar-Friedman. . .

External links

 

1926 establishments in California
Berkshire Hathaway
Companies based in Edina, Minnesota
Food and drink companies based in Los Angeles
Fast-food chains of the United States
Fast-food franchises
Hot dog restaurants
Juice bars
Restaurant chains in the United States
Restaurants established in 1926
1987 mergers and acquisitions